Samad Behrangi (June 24, 1939 – August 31, 1968) was an Iranian teacher, social activist and critic, folklorist, translator, and short story writer of Azerbaijani descent. He is famous for his children's books, particularly The Little Black Fish. Influenced by predominantly leftist ideologies that were common among the intelligentsia of his era‌, which made him popular among the Organization of Iranian People's Fedai Guerrillas, his books typically portrayed the lives of the children of the urban poor and encouraged the individual to change his/ her circumstances by her own initiatives.

Early life
He was born on June 24, 1939 in the neighborhood of Harandab in the city of Tabriz, Imperial State of Iran. He was from a working-class family, his parents were Sara and Ezzat, and he had two brothers and three sisters. His father was seasonal worker and his income was never sufficient, his father eventually left Iran like millions of other workers on the move for better life conditions for the Caucasus and never returned.

He finished elementary school and three years of secondary school in Tabriz, before enrolling in a rural teacher training school. He spent two years at the Daneshsarayea-Keshavarzi and finishing the program in 1957. Thus, only receiving few years of education, at the age of 18, he became a teacher, and continued to be so for the rest of his life, in the East Azerbaijan Province of Iran.

Career 
In the next eleven years, while teaching Persian in rural schools of Iranian Azerbaijan, he attained a B.A. degree in English from Tabriz University. He started publishing stories in 1960, his first being Adat (English: Habit). He carried on writing stories, along translating from English and Azerbaijani to Farsi, and vice versa. Later, he was dismissed from his high school teaching position, due to a claim that he was impolite, and assigned to an elementary school. Then, as his cultural works increased, he was accused and pursecuted, and suspended of teaching. After a while his sentence was called off and he returned to schools. Later, he attended student protests.

Apart from children's stories, he wrote many pedagogical essays and collected and published several samples of oral Iranian Azerbaijani literature. His folklore studies have usually been done with the help of his colleague Behrooz Dehghani, who helped publish some of Behrangi's works after his early death. Behrangi also has a few Azeri translations from Persian poems by Ahmad Shamlou, Forough Farrokhzad, and Mehdi Akhavan-Sales.

Publications
Apart from children's stories, he wrote many pedagogical essays and collected and published several samples of oral Azerbaijani literature. His folklore studies have usually been done with the help of his colleague Behrooz Dehghani, who helped publish some of Behrangi's works after his early death. Behrangi also has a few Azerbaijani language translations of Persian poems by Ahmad Shamlou, Forough Farrokhzad, and Mehdi Akhavan-Sales.

List of publications 

 
 

 
 The Complete Stories of Behrang, publishers, Persian Culture & Art Institute, Vancouver and Zagros Publications, Montreal, Canada

Death
Behrangi drowned on August 31, 1968 in the Aras river and his death was blamed on the Pahlavi government. It is believed that an army officer, Hamzeh Farahati, was seen with him when he drowned. Farahati in his book and in an interview with VOA has unequivocally claimed that Samad drowned and was not killed by SAVAK.

He was buried in the Imamieh cemetery (or Emamiyyeh cemetery; Farsi:قبرستان امامیه) in the Imamieh neighborhood of Tabriz.

See also

 Imamieh
 Tabriz

References

Further reading
 Milani, Abbas. "Samad Behrangi," in Eminent Persians, Vol. 2. Syracuse, New York: Syracuse University Press, 2008, pp. 838–842
 Preface and backcover text from Samad Behrangi, Talkhoon va Chand Ghesse-ye Digar (Talkhoon and other stories), Behrangi Publishings, Tabriz, 1998, .
 
 Tahbaz, Sirous, Samad Behrangi va Mahi-e Koochooloo-ye Daanaa (Samad Behrangi and the Wise Little Fish).

External links

Samad's Stories in English
Samad Stories: The Little Black Fish
Samad Stories: 24 Restless Hours
Samad Stories: The Little Sugar Beet Vendor
Samad Stories: The Tale of Love
Samad Stories: Talkhun
Samad Stories: In Search of Faith
 Samad's life and the stories

Azerbaijani-language writers
Iranian children's writers
Iranian essayists
People from Tabriz
1939 births
1968 deaths
Deaths by drowning
University of Tabriz alumni
Poets from Tabriz
20th-century essayists
Translators of Forough Farrokhzad
20th-century translators
Iranian schoolteachers